Ayya is a Pali word, translated as "honourable" or "worthy".

It is most commonly used as a veneration in addressing or referring to an ordained female Buddhist monk, most often of the Theravādin tradition in Southeast Asia. It is sometimes mistaken as equivalent to Christian use of the word, "sister." Ayya can refer to either a Bhikkhunī (fully ordained and usually wearing orange or yellow robes in Southeast Asia) or a Samaneri (shramanerika) ten-precept novice renunciant or a Sikkhamana (wearing white, brown or sometimes pink), but not to non-ordained precept-holders.

Generally for bhikkhunis, robes would be maroon with yellow in Tibet; gray (for Mahayana) or orange/yellow (for Theravadins) in Vietnam; gray in Korea; gray or black in China and Taiwan; black in Japan; orange or yellow in Thailand, Sri Lanka, Nepal, Laos, Cambodia, and Burma. The colour of robes distinguishes both level of ordination and tradition, with white (usually worn by a male renunciant before ordination) or pink symbolising a state of ambiguity, being on the threshold of a decision, no longer secular and not yet monastic. In Myanmar, Ten-precepts ordained nuns or the Sayalays (there are no fully ordained bhikkhunis) are usually wearing pink. A key exception to this is in the countries where women are not allowed to wear robes that signify full ordination, Cambodia, Laos, Myanmar (Burma), Thailand and (Theravadin in) Vietnam. So, the majority of ayyas wear orange/yellow or white/pink.

Re-establishment of Bhikkhuni lineage
There are very few fully ordained (Bhikkhunī) Ayyas in the 21st century because the Theravadan nuns' lineage was destroyed and lost in South Asia and Southeast Asia over the last 1,000 years. The Theravādin Bhikkhunī lineage was reinstated in 1996 at Sarnath, India, by a quorum of Theravada monks and Korean nuns. Eleven Sinhalese dasa sil mata nuns took full bhikkhuni ordination in that ceremony, reviving the Theravada Bhikkhuni Order after 980 years of decline and dissipation. Theravādin ordination is available for women (as of 2006) in Sri Lanka, where many of the current bhikkhunis have been ordained. The ordination process has several stages, which can begin with Anagarika (non-ordained) precepts and wearing white robes, but is as far as many women are allowed to take their practice. In Thailand, ordination of women, although legal since 1992, is almost never practiced and nearly all female monastics are known as Maechis (also spelled "mae chee"), regardless of their level of attainment.

As awareness of the need for ordained women to study and practice grows, so does the support for female monks. There are very few places for an ayya to reside, once she ordains. The number of nunneries and Viharas for women is still small, but increasing.

See also
 :Category:Theravada Buddhist monks
 Ajahn
 Bhante
 Sayadaw
 Therīgāthā

References

Pali words and phrases
Thai Buddhist titles
Ordination of women in Buddhism
Buddhism in Thailand
Buddhist titles